Iassinae is a subfamily of leafhoppers in the family Cicadellidae.

Tribes and selected genera

Batracomorphini
Authority: Krishnankutty, Dietrich, Dai & Siddappaji, 2016
 Batracomorphus Lewis, 1834

Bythoniini
Authority: Linnavuori, 1959 - monotypic
 Bythonia Oman, 1938

Gyponini
Authority: Stål, 1870

 Gypona Germar, 1821
 Gyponana Ball, 1920
 Polana DeLong, 1942
 Ponana Ball, 1920
 Rugosana DeLong, 1942
(over 50 additional genera)

Hoplojassini
Authority: Krishnankutty, Dietrich, Dai & Siddappaji, 2016

Hyalojassini
Authority: Evans, 1972

 Absheta Blocker, 1979
 Aztrania Blocker, 1979
 Baldriga Blocker, 1979
 Bertawolia Blocker, 1979
 Betawala Blocker, 1979
 Comanopa Blocker, 1979
 Coriojassus Evans, 1972
 Daveyoungana Blocker & Webb, 1992
 Decliviassus Dai, Dietrich & Zhang, 2015
 Derakandra Blocker, 1979
 Donleva Blocker, 1979
 Gargaropsis Fowler, 1896
 Garlica Blocker, 1976
 Gehundra Blocker, 1976
 Goblinaja Kramer, 1965
 Grunchia Kramer, 1963
 Hyalojassus Evans, 1972
 Jivena Blocker, 1976
 Julipopa Blocker, 1979
 Kanchanaburiassus Dai, Dietrich & Zhang, 2015
 Lamelliassus Dai, Dietrich & Zhang, 2015
 Maranata Blocker, 1979
 Mogenola Blocker, 1979
 Momoria Blocker, 1979 c g b
 Neotrocnada Krishnankutty & Dietrich, 2012
 Penestragania Beamer & Lawson, 1945 c g b
 Platyhynna Berg, 1884
 Redaprata Blocker, 1979
 Siamiassus Dai, Dietrich & Zhang, 2015
 Siniassus Dai, Dietrich & Zhang, 2015
 Stragania Stal, 1862 i c g b
 Torenadoga Blocker, 1979
 Trocniassus Dai, Dietrich & Zhang, 2015
 Webaskola Blocker, 1979

Iassini
Authority: Walker, 1870
 Acacioiassus Linnavuori & Quartau, 1975
 Iassus Fabricius, 1803 c g b

Krisnini
Authority: Evans, 1947

Gessius Distant, 1908
Krisna Kirkaldy, 1900
Parakrisna Cai & He, 2001

Lipokrisnini
Authority: Krishnankutty, Dietrich, Dai & Siddappaji, 2016

Platyjassini
Authority: Evans, 1953

Reuplemmelini
Authority: Evans, 1966
 Aloplemmeles Evans, 1966
 Reuplemmeles Evans, 1966
 Siderojassus Evans, 1972

Selenomorphini
Authority: Evans, 1974
 Pachyopsis Uhler, 1877

Trocnadini
Authority: Evans, 1947
 Thalattoscopus Kirkaldy, 1905
 Trocnada Walker, 1858
 Trocnadella Singh-Pruthi, 1930

References

Further reading

External links

 

 
Cicadellidae
Hemiptera subfamilies